Diadasia australis is a species of chimney bee in the family Apidae. It is found in Central America and North America.

Subspecies
These three subspecies belong to the species Diadasia australis:
 Diadasia australis australis (Cresson, 1878)
 Diadasia australis californica (Cresson, 1878)
 Diadasia australis knabiana Cockerell

References

Further reading

External links

 

Apinae
Articles created by Qbugbot
Insects described in 1878